Down East Yachts (USCG Manufacturer's Identification Code (MIC) - AAY) was a manufacturer of sailboats headquartered in Santa Ana, California.

History
According to United States Coast Guard records, the company was founded on August 5, 1974, and went out of business on July 12, 1983. The company was founded by Bob Poole, who had previously worked for Columbia Yachts. The company began production in 1974 and, after the death of the founder on April 29, 1978, his molds were sold to Newport Offshore Yachts.

The heart of a sailboat company is the design of its boats.  Down East Yachts started with a single boat, the Downeaster 38 which was designed by Henry Morschladt, a California Naval Architect who specialized in cruising sailboats.  The design was traditional, with a wineglass stern, full keel, and bowsprit.  As additional boats were added to the line, they were modifications of this original design.

In addition to manufacturing their own boats, Down East Yachts was contracted to finish several hulls made by Westsail as it was closing its doors in 1980.

Sailboats 
Four sailboats were manufactured by the company. All were heavily built cruisers suitable for blue water sailing and were available in Ketch, Schooner, and Cutter configurations:
 Downeaster 32, 1975 - 1980.
 Downeaster 38, 1974 - 1981.
 Downeaster 41, 1980 - 1981.
 Downeaster 45, 1977 - 1981.

Downeaster 45 Hull number 1 in schooner configuration

Trawlers 
Down East Yachts acquired the molds and tooling for the Defever 40 Passagemaker from Jensen Marine when they ceased operations in 1980. Production was resumed as the Downeast 40.

See also
 List of sailboat designers and manufacturers

References 
 The Proper Yacht, 2nd Edition by Arthur Beiser, International Marine, 1978
 Mauch's Sailboat Guide Vol I, by Jan Mauch, Oceanside Publishing Co, 1991
 Heart of Glass, by Daniel Spurr, McGraw Hill, 2000,2004
 Review, © Motor Boating & Sailing /  May 1977

External links 
 Downeasteryachts.com
 Downeaster 32 review
 http://schooner-britannia.com/index.html

American boat builders
Yacht building companies
Companies based in Santa Ana, California
Manufacturing companies established in 1974
Manufacturing companies disestablished in 1983
1974 establishments in California
1983 disestablishments in California
Defunct manufacturing companies based in Greater Los Angeles